Lecithocera levirota is a moth in the family Lecithoceridae. It was described by Chun-Sheng Wu and You-Qiao Liu in 1993. It is found in Anhui, China.

The wingspan is about 17 mm. The species resembles Lecithocera ianthodes.

References

Moths described in 1993
levirota